The Exeed LX is a compact crossover produced by Chery under the Exeed premium brand.

Overview

In July 2019, the Exeed LX compact crossover was revealed based on the same platform as the first generation Chery Tiggo 7 while featuring  restyled front and rear ends. Exeed is the premium brand of Chery marketed towards the European market, and the LX is the second model under the brand following the Exeed TX. Interior-wise, the LX designs are completely different from Tiggo 7, with the instrument panel and multimedia screen integrated as a single set. The central console is floating and houses the gearshift knob and the digital air conditioning controls.

The Exeed LX was launched on the Chinese car market in the fourth quarter of 2019 with pricing to start around 130,000 yuan ($18,950).

The Exeed LX received a facelift with an additional Chinese name called the Zhuifeng (追风) for the 2022 model year.

Powertrain
The transmission of the Exeed LX is an automated seven-speed dual-clutch transmission. A 1.5-litre petrol turbo engine producing  and an estimated torque of  mated to a 9-speed CVT transmission was added to the 2020 model year.

Markets

Brazil
Caoa Chery in Brazil is the producer and distributor of products from Exeed, with the first Exeed model commercialized in the Brazilian market from the first quarter of 2021. The LX crossover SUV was chosen for the debut of Exeed in Brazil due to the T1X platform and other components shared with the Tiggo 7 made in Anápolis.

Russia
The Exeed LX was launched to the Russian market in March 2022 with a 1.5-litre petrol turbo engine producing  and a CVT transmission. The four-wheel-drive version with a 1.6-litre petrol turbo engine producing  and a DCT transmission was launched in December 2022.

References

External links

 

Exeed LX
Compact sport utility vehicles
Crossover sport utility vehicles
Cars of China
Cars introduced in 2019